George Joseph Barker (26 June 1916 – 5 July 1993) was an Australian rules footballer who played with Hawthorn in the Victorian Football League (VFL).

He was the brother of Jack Barker who also played with Hawthorn in this period.

Notes

External links 

1916 births
1993 deaths
Australian rules footballers from Victoria (Australia)
Hawthorn Football Club players